Liberty Downtown Historic District is a historic district located at Liberty in Sullivan County, New York.  The district includes 112 contributing buildings and comprises the village's commercial core.  It subsumes the Liberty Village Historic District listed in 1978, which had 12 contributing buildings.

It was listed on the National Register of Historic Places in 1978 and 2006. Allan Bérubé (1946–2007) helped to establish the enlarged historic district.

Gallery

References

Historic districts on the National Register of Historic Places in New York (state)
Georgian architecture in New York (state)
Historic districts in Sullivan County, New York
National Register of Historic Places in Sullivan County, New York